Robin Hill Country Park is an  theme park located in Downend; outside Newport, Isle of Wight. Robin Hill is owned by the Dabell family, who also own Blackgang Chine; another Isle of Wight amusement Park located in Ventnor on the Isle of Wight. The park has four main rides: A quarter-mile downhill toboggan, 4D Motion Cinema, 'Cows Express' Junior train ride and the 'Colossus' a swinging galleon boat ride. On the site of Robin Hill is the buried farmstead of Combley Roman Villa. This is explained in the 'Romans at Robin Hill' exhibition when at the park. Robin Hill is also noted for wildlife, particularly the red squirrels.

The park was the location for the annual Bestival music festival held every September, but has now moved to Lulworth Castle in Dorset.  In 2009 it received a "Tourism & Leisure Business Award for Excellence" from the Isle of Wight Chamber of Commerce In 2016, it was announced that Bestival was changing location to Dorset.

The park organises a number of regular events. "Electric Woods" events happen several times a year with different themes. February Half term Electric Woods 'Spirit of the Orient' (Chinese New Year), Summer Holidays Various themes, Summer 2015 'Carnival ' October Half Term 'Electric Woods' 'Festival of Light' inspired by Diwali.

The park has cafés, ice creams and snack kiosks, a gift shop and a car park.

Park attractions

The park owners claim to place less emphasis on thrill seeking rides and more upon rides which fit into its 'countryside ethos'.

Colossus: A swinging galleon boat ride.
Toboggan Run: A 300-metre twisting and turning alpine slide of metal half-pipe.
4D Motion Cinema (formerly the Time Machine): A 28-seat motion platform simulator.
Wooden Maze: A large wooden maze with a centre and bridge.
Tree Top Trail: A Children's Play area trail surrounded by trees close to the café.
Troll Island Bridges: Bridges leading to several islands over a carp-filled pond.
Carp Quay: A large lake with fish food available to buy and feed the fish living there.
Duckdown Play Village: A small child-sized village.
Run Rabbit: Various large underground rabbit tunnels.
Activity Course: An activity course with various equipment including a zip wire and scramble net. Located in Toboggan Valley 
Snake and Hillbilly Slides: An area with slides set into the hillside.
Splash Attack: game with buttons to press and fire water jets.
Tot's Play: A special area designated for very young visitors which is located next to the Toboggan.
Squirrel Tower: A tall tower themed around the island's red squirrels. Links with the Canopy Skywalk. 
African Adventure: Adventure playground, themed as an African village.
Canopy Skywalk: A walk-along attraction which is 10 metres high and links with the Squirrel tower.  
Cows Express Junior Train Ride: A small train style ride.
The Parting: A sunken walk way through a pond. 
Woodland Walks. 
Falconry: 3 Daily displays

References

External links

 http://www.robin-hill.com/ Robin Hill official website
 http://www.electricwoods.co.uk/ Electric Woods website

Amusement parks in England
Tourist attractions on the Isle of Wight
Parks and open spaces on the Isle of Wight
1971 establishments in England